The Leica M7 is a 35 mm rangefinder camera introduced by Leica AG in 2002 as a direct successor to the M6. The electronic Leica M7 is a departure from previous mechanical designs for the M series.

Details
The M7 introduced auto-exposure in aperture priority mode: the user sets the aperture on the lens manually, and the camera chooses a shutter speed. Manual exposure is also available. The shutter is electronically controlled, but speeds of 1/60 and 1/125 of a second are mechanically governed if the battery fails. Unlike the M6 TTL whose "off" position only disables the meter, the M7 features a switch on the shutter release, which prevents both metering and the shutter from firing. The shutter release is redesigned with two distinct levels of pressure: the first detent locks the exposure reading, the second fires the shutter.

The M7 is also the first Leica M series to support film DX encoding and exposure compensation using the dial that has been on the back of Leica cameras since the M3. Originally used simply as a reminder of the sensitivity of the film, and then as film speed setting coupled to the light meter starting with the M6, the dial now controls exposure compensation on the M7.

The M7 offers viewfinders with magnifications 0.58, 0.72 (28 mm) and 0.85 (35 mm). The viewfinder optics are multicoated to reduce flare.

End of production
It's been reported on Red Dot Forum on 2018 May 24 that Leica has officially discontinued producing the M7 in both black and silver versions. There might be cameras in stock at retailers but no new cameras will be available once the current inventories are sold.  No more orders are being taken for M7s through the "a la carte" customization program.

See also
 Leica M8 digital rangefinder camera

References

External links 

 Leica M7 on luminous-landscape.com
 Leica M7 by Karen Nakamura
 Leica M7 Technical Data at Leica Camera AG

M7

de:Leica M7